Rudnyansky District is the name of several administrative and municipal districts in Russia:
Rudnyansky District, Smolensk Oblast, an administrative and municipal district of Smolensk Oblast
Rudnyansky District, Volgograd Oblast, an administrative and municipal district of Volgograd Oblast

See also
Rudnyansky (disambiguation)

References